Employees of the Year is the debut EP from Toronto rap group The 20/20 Project. It was released by Incognito Entertainment on July 27, 2010 and marketed by URBNET Records and was produced, mixed and mastered by DjUnknown.  The album features one guest appearance by Akim of Tru-Paz on the remix to the lead single "Back to Work". The EP received generally positive reviews and consistently charted in the top 10 on a number of Campus Radio Stations across Canada.  It peaked #1 on Ottawa's CHUO 89.1 hip hop charts the week ending November 16, 2010.

Track listing

Singles
"Back to Work" (July 27, 2010)
"Explain This" (October 12, 2010)
"Complicated" (November 23, 2010)

References

2010 debut EPs
The 20/20 Project albums